Tollesburg is an unincorporated community in Lewis County, Kentucky, United States. It lies on the western edge of the county and borders Mason County. The community is part of the Maysville Micropolitan Statistical Area. It is the birthplace of Lucille P. Markey, a racehorse breeder and philanthropist.

References

Unincorporated communities in Lewis County, Kentucky
Unincorporated communities in Kentucky
Maysville, Kentucky micropolitan area